Graeme Taylor (born 2 February 1954 in Stockwell, South-West London) is a British guitarist.

Taylor played lead guitar with 1970s medieval/rock band Gryphon, and leading folk rock bands including the Albion Band and Home Service. With Gryphon he had 4 best-selling LPs, and toured the US, supporting Yes at Madison Square Gardens, and the Mahavishnu Orchestra at the Houston Astrodome. In 1975, he played on Steve Howe's debut solo album Beginnings, with two other members of Gryphon, Malcolm Bennett and Dave Oberlé. 

Taylor played a major role in the creation and performance of the music for The Mysteries at the National Theatre in 1977 a production - to a text adapted by the poet Tony Harrison - that was revived in 1999, with Taylor in the role of musical director, arranger and composer of additional music.

Having spent many years playing guitars in the pit orchestras of many West End musicals, Taylor became a member of the touring bands for both John Tams and Rolf Harris, and runs his own studio in South London.

References

External links 
Graeme Taylor's website

British rock guitarists
British male guitarists
1954 births
People from Stockwell
Living people
The Albion Band members
Gryphon (band) members
Home Service members